Emily Clark (born November 28, 1995) is a Canadian ice hockey player for the Montréal section of the PWHPA and has competed for the Canadian national Under-18 team in 2011. She made her debut with the Canada women's national ice hockey team at the 2014 4 Nations Cup. In the autumn of 2014, she joined the Wisconsin Badgers women's ice hockey program. She also competed with the Canadian National team at the 2018 Winter Olympics where she helped Canada win a silver medal.

Early life
Clark was born in Saskatoon, Saskatchewan, on November 28, 1995. She was the youngest of six children, all of whom played hockey, and her father served as a local coach.

Playing career
During the 2010–11 season, Clark was the alternate captain for the Saskatoon Stars as they reached the Saskatchewan Female Midget AAA Hockey League championship game for the second consecutive season. In addition, she won a gold medal at the Mac's Tournament with the Stars. She was part of Team Saskatchewan which competed at the 2011 Canada Winter Games. In 2009–10, Clark won the Tier 2 Saskatoon city championship with the Saskatoon Flyers.

Hockey Canada
In August 2011, Clark competed with the Under 18 Canadian National Women's ice hockey team in a three-game series versus the United States. In the third game of the series, Clark scored a goal, and Canada won the series. In addition, she was the youngest player on the team, and one of only three women from Saskatchewan invited to try out for the team.

NCAA
In her NCAA debut on October 3, 2014, Clark registered three points (two goals, one assist) in a 4–1 victory against the Minnesota-Duluth Bulldogs.

During December 2016, Clark tied for the WCHA lead in both points scored with eight and assists with seven, while leading the conference in plus/minus rating with a +7 rating. She would record an assist in Wisconsin's 8–2 win against their archrivals, the Minnesota Golden Gophers, on December 4, 2016.

In a December 9, 2016, contest against the Ohio State Buckeyes, she established a career-high for most points in a game with five, compiling a goal and four assists in a 7–0 triumph. In each game contested in December, she logged at least one point in every game. For her efforts, she was recognized as the WCHA Player of the Month, the first in her career.

Clark expected to play professional hockey in the Canadian Women's Hockey League, but they discontinued operations before her college graduation. She additionally decided to join the Professional Women's Hockey Players Association and to boycott playing in the National Women's Hockey League or any other professional North American women's hockey league until one that is sustainable is developed.

2018 Winter Olympics
Clark was selected to compete for Team Canada in the 2018 Winter Olympics in PyeongChang, South Korea. Clark recorded her first Olympic goal in the semi-finals against the Olympic athletes from Russia, which Canada won 5–0. She helped Team Canada take home a silver medal in a shootout against the United States.

2022 Winter Olympics
On January 11, 2022, Clark was named to Canada's 2022 Olympic team.

Career statistics

Hockey Canada

SFMAAAHL

NCAA

Awards and honours
WCHA Rookie of the Week (Week of October 7, 2014)
WCHA Offensive Player of the Week (Week of February 3, 2015)
WCHA Player of the Month (December 2016)

Personal life 
Clark is a member of the LGBT community.

References

External links

1995 births
Canadian expatriate ice hockey players in the United States
Canadian women's ice hockey forwards
Ice hockey people from Saskatchewan
Ice hockey players at the 2018 Winter Olympics
Ice hockey players at the 2022 Winter Olympics
Living people
Medalists at the 2018 Winter Olympics
Medalists at the 2022 Winter Olympics
Olympic ice hockey players of Canada
Olympic medalists in ice hockey
Olympic gold medalists for Canada
Olympic silver medalists for Canada
Sportspeople from Saskatoon
Wisconsin Badgers women's ice hockey players
Professional Women's Hockey Players Association players
Canadian LGBT sportspeople
LGBT ice hockey players
Lesbian sportswomen